The Somerton Viaduct is a historic railway viaduct in the town of Somerton in Somerset, England. It is situated on the Langport and Castle Cary Railway, known as the Castle Cary Cut-off, on the Reading to Taunton Line. It carries the railway over the River Cary. 

The viaduct was opened in 1906.  The construction was overseen by Great Western Railway engineer P.A. Anthony.

References 

Rail transport in Somerset
Bridges in Somerset
Somerton, Somerset